Allaster William Buchanan (May 17, 1927 – January 17, 1994) was a Canadian professional ice hockey left winger who played four games in the National Hockey League with the Toronto Maple Leafs during the 1948–49 and 1949–50 seasons. The rest of his career, which lasted from 1948 to 1955, was spent in the minor leagues.

Career statistics

Regular season and playoffs

Awards and achievements
 Memorial Cup Championship (1946)

External links
 

1927 births
1994 deaths
Canadian ice hockey left wingers
Maritime Major Hockey League players
Ontario Hockey Association Senior A League (1890–1979) players
Ice hockey people from Winnipeg
Toronto Marlboros players
Toronto Maple Leafs players
Winnipeg Monarchs players